Novy Mir is a rural locality in Selektsionny Selsoviet Rural Settlement, Lgovsky District, Kursk Oblast, Russia. Population:

Geography 
The village is located on the Rechitsa River (a left tributary of the Seym), 45 km from the Russia–Ukraine border, 74 km south-west of Kursk, 9 km south-west of the district center – the town Lgov, 2.5 km from the selsoviet center – Selektsionny.

 Climate
Novy Mir has a warm-summer humid continental climate (Dfb in the Köppen climate classification).

Transport 
Novy Mir is located on the road of regional importance  (Kursk – Lgov – Rylsk – border with Ukraine) as part of the European route E38, 2 km from the road of intermunicipal significance  (38K-017 – Fitizh), 3.5 km from the nearest railway halt 387 km (railway line 322 km – Lgov I).

The rural locality is situated 81 km from Kursk Vostochny Airport, 149 km from Belgorod International Airport and 283 km from Voronezh Peter the Great Airport.

References

Notes

Sources

Rural localities in Lgovsky District